Samuel John Galton Jr. FRS (18 June 1753 – 19 June 1832) was an English arms manufacturer. He was born in Duddeston, Birmingham, England, into a Quaker family; despite that background he became a merchant selling guns. He was a member of the Lunar Society and lived at Great Barr Hall. He also built a house at Warley Woods, and commissioned Humphry Repton to lay out its grounds.

Galton married Lucy Barclay (1757–1817), daughter of Robert Barclay Allardice, MP, 5th of Urie. They had eight children:

 Mary Anne Galton (1778–1856), married Lambert Schimmelpenninck in 1806
 Sophia Galton (1782–1863) married Charles Brewin in 1833
 Samuel Tertius Galton (1783–1844) (whose son Francis Galton was also notable)
 Theodore Galton (1784–1810)
 Adele Galton (1784–1869) married John Kaye Booth, MD, in 1827, dsp.
 Hubert John Barclay Galton (1789–1864)
 Ewen Cameron Galton, (1791–1800), died aged 9.
 John Howard Galton (1794–1862), father of Douglas Strutt Galton.

Galton was a lover of animals and even owned many bloodhounds. He loved birds as well, publishing three book volumes about them.

Galton owned  of land at Westhay Moor, Somerset, which he had drained, by constructing Galton's Canal.

He is remembered by the Moonstones in Birmingham and a tower block in the centre of that city.

Galton was condemned by the Quakers for manufacturing guns, as they believed it was against their pacifist values. His defense stated that since Britain was in a constant state of war, it was his duty as a citizen of his country to contribute through its massive industrial complex.

References

Further reading
 

1753 births
1832 deaths
Darwin–Wedgwood family
Fellows of the Royal Society
People from Birmingham, West Midlands
Members of the Lunar Society of Birmingham